Pueblo Nuevo is one of the 39 municipalities of Durango, in northwestern Mexico. The municipal seat lies at El Salto. The municipality covers an area of 6178.3 km2.

The village of Pueblo Nuevo which was the seat of government of the municipality before the 1920s. The village is on the new four-lane highway route between Durango, Durango and Mazatlan, Sinaloa and is likely to see expanding tourist traffic due to its proximity to the Baluarte Bridge.

As of 2010, the municipality had a total population of 49,162.

The municipality had 543 localities.  As of the 2010 census, the largest are El Salto (24,241), La Ciudad (2,609), classified as urban, and San Bernardino de Milpillas Chico (1,296), classified as rural.

References

Municipalities of Durango